The Nicaragua national football team represents Nicaragua in men's international football and is controlled by the Nicaraguan Football Federation. Nicaragua achieved its first qualification to a major international competition in 2009, as they qualified for the 2009 Gold Cup as the last entrant from Central America, after a 2–0 win over Guatemala in the fifth place match in the 2009 Nations Cup. However, the team has never qualified for the FIFA World Cup.

Due to American influence throughout the country's history, baseball has more of a following as both a pursuit and spectator event in Nicaragua than football.

History
Nicaragua traveled to El Salvador for their first ever international, losing 9–0 to the hosts on 1 May 1929. They did not play another match for over twelve years, until the qualifying group for the 1941 CCCF Championship in Costa Rica. They lost all 4 games: 7–2 to the hosts Costa Rica on 10 May, 8–0 to El Salvador on 13 May, 9–1 to the Netherlands Antilles on 15 May and 5–2 to Panama on 18 May. Therefore, Nicaragua finished bottom of the group and did not make the final group.

Recent times
After qualifying for the 2019 Gold Cup on the back of finishing ninth in Nations League qualifying, they would go on to finish bottom of the group with losses to Costa Rica, Haiti and Bermuda.

Schedule and results
The following is a list of match results in the last 12 months, as well as any future matches that have been scheduled.

2022

2023

Coaching staff

Coaching history

  José "Chingolo" Rodríguez (Unknown)
  Omar Zambrana (Unknown)
  Octavio Edmundo Salas Urbina (1941–1943)
  Eduardo Kosovic (1943)
  José Antonio Pipa Cordero (1947)
  Santiago Bonilla (1952–1953)
  Ferenc Mészáros (1961)
  Carlos Ruiz (1961–1962)
  Santiago Berrini (1965–1967)
  Livio Bendaña Espinoza (1967–1969)
  Omar Muraco (1969–1970)
  Salvador Dubois Leiva (1977)
  Orlando Casares (1980–1981)
  Ján Fülöp (1984–1986)
  Salvador Dubois Leiva (1991–1992)
  Mauricio Cruz Jiron (1993–2001)
  Florencio Levia (2001–2002)
  Maurizio Battistini (2003–2004)
  Marcelo Javier Zuleta (2005)
  Carlos De Toro (2007–2008)
  Mauricio Cruz Jiron (2008)
  Ramón Otoniel Olivas (2008–2009)
  Enrique Llena (2010–2014)
  Javier Londono (2014)
  Henry Duarte (2014–2020)
  Juan Vita (2020–2022)
  Marco Antonio Figueroa (2022–)

Players

Current squad
 The following players were called up for the Friendly match.
 Match dates: 19 November 2022
 Opposition: Caps and goals correct as of:' 17 November 2022, after the match against .

Recent call-ups
The following players have been called up for the team in the last twelve months.

INJ Player withdrew from the squad due to an injury.
PRE Preliminary squad.
RET Player retired from the national team.
SUS Player is serving suspension.
WD Player withdrew from the squad due to non-injury issue.

RecordsPlayers in bold are still active with Nicaragua.Most appearances

Top goalscorers

Competitive record

FIFA World Cup
The Nicaragua national football team has never qualified for the World Cup. Their latest attempt was for the 2022 World Cup, when the side failed to advance from the first round.

CONCACAF Gold Cup

CONCACAF Nations League

Copa Centroamericana

CCCF Championship

Pan American Games

Central American and Caribbean Games

Central American Games

Head-to-head recordAs of 19 November 2022 after the match against ''.

See also

 Nicaragua national under-20 football team
 List of football clubs in Nicaragua

References

External links

  
 Nicaragua FIFA profile
 Nicaragua – List of International Matches at RSSSF

 
Central American national association football teams